Gail Delta Collins Pappalardi (February 2, 1941 – December 6, 2013) was an American songwriter, producer, and artist.

Biography
She came to prominence (as 'Miss Gail Collins') co-producing, with Pappalardi, the self-titled debut album by Energy, a group featuring Corky Laing. She also co-produced, with Felix Pappalardi, the Felix Pappalardi and Creation album in 1976. Collins Pappalardi co-wrote Cream's "World of Pain" with her husband Felix Pappalardi and "Strange Brew" with Pappalardi and Eric Clapton. Both songs are included on the album Disraeli Gears.  She contributed lyrics to many Mountain songs. Her artwork appears on many album covers by Mountain, including Climbing!, Nantucket Sleighride, Flowers of Evil, Mountain Live: The Road Goes Ever On, Twin Peaks and Avalanche. She was associate producer on the 1978 album by Hot Tuna, Double Dose.

On April 17, 1983, Felix Pappalardi was shot once in the neck in the fifth-floor New York City apartment he shared with Collins Pappalardi. He was pronounced dead at the scene and Collins Pappalardi was charged with second degree murder. Collins Pappalardi claimed that the killing was an accident. During the trial it was revealed that the couple had an open marriage and that Collins Pappalardi had shot her husband after he had returned in the early morning from seeing his girlfriend. She was acquitted of second degree murder and manslaughter, but found guilty of criminally negligent homicide and sentenced to 16 months to 4 years in prison. On April 30, 1985, she was released on parole.

On December 6, 2013, Collins was found dead by her landlord in the Mexican village of Ajijic, Jalisco, a resort town with many American expatriate residents. She had been undergoing cancer treatments there. She was cremated.

References

1941 births
Place of birth missing
2013 deaths
American expatriates in Mexico
American people convicted of manslaughter
American women songwriters
American murderers
Prisoners and detainees of New York (state)
20th-century American criminals
Mariticides
People from Ajijic
20th-century American women
21st-century American women